Live Easy  is an unincorporated community  in Greene County, Pennsylvania, United States.

The origin of the name Live Easy is obscure.

References

Unincorporated communities in Greene County, Pennsylvania
Unincorporated communities in Pennsylvania